Megan Adelle Kleine (born December 22, 1974), later known by her married name Megan Morris, is an American former competition swimmer and Olympic gold medalist.  At the 1992 Summer Olympics in Barcelona, Spain, she earned a gold medal by swimming for the winning U.S. team in the preliminary heats of the women's 4×100-meter medley relay.  Individually, she also competed in the B Final of the women's 100-meter breaststroke event, and finished with the twelfth-best time overall (1:11.07) at the 1992 Olympics.

See also
 List of Olympic medalists in swimming (women)
 List of University of Texas at Austin alumni

References
 

1974 births
Living people
American female breaststroke swimmers
Olympic gold medalists for the United States in swimming
Sportspeople from Dallas
Swimmers at the 1992 Summer Olympics
Texas Longhorns women's swimmers
Medalists at the 1992 Summer Olympics
20th-century American women